Ann Sophia Towne Darrah (1819–1881) was an American painter who often depicted the White Mountains of New Hampshire.

Biography
Darrah was born in 1819 in Philadelphia. She was a student of Paul Weber.

Her work was included in the 1858 New Bedford Art Exhibition organized by the landscape painter Albert Bierstadt. From 1855 to 1864 Darrah exhibited in group exhibitions at the Boston Athenæum. From 1856 to 1867 she also exhibited at the Pennsylvania Academy of the Fine Arts.

Darrah died in 1881.

Legacy
In 1882 the Museum of Fine Arts, Boston, held a memorial exhibition of her work.

Darrah's work was included as part of a historical retrospective on American art in the Palace of Fine Arts at the 1893 World's Columbian Exposition in Chicago.

Gallery

References

External links
 
Images of Darrah's art on artNET

1819 births
1881 deaths
American women painters
19th-century American women artists
19th-century American painters